Karol Rotner is an Israeli former professional association footballer who played for Maccabi Haifa and the New York Cosmos.

Early life 
Rotner was born in Romania, and immigrated with his family to Israel in 1951 and made aliyah.

Playing career 
Rotner made his league debut in a match against Hapoel Ramat Gan on 5 June 1965.  In 1973, he played three games for the New York Cosmos of the North American Soccer League.

External links
 Profile and biography of Karol Rotman on Maccabi Haifa's official website 
 New York Cosmos stats

Living people
Romanian Jews
Israeli Jews
Romanian emigrants to Israel
Jewish Romanian sportspeople
Israeli footballers
Maccabi Haifa F.C. players
New York Cosmos players
North American Soccer League (1968–1984) players
Liga Leumit players
Israeli expatriate footballers
Expatriate soccer players in the United States
Israeli expatriate sportspeople in the United States
Association football defenders
Year of birth missing (living people)